The Canterbury Country Cardinals were a New Zealand rugby league club that represented Canterbury in the Lion Red Cup from 1994 to 1996. They were administered by the Canterbury Rugby League.

The Country Cardinals drew from the Halswell, Papanui, Hornby, Lincoln University and Marist-Western Suburbs clubs.

Notable players
Notable players included Glen Coughlan, Phil Bancroft, Logan Edwards, Shane Endacott, Paul Johnson, Blair Harding, Mark Nixon, Henry Suluvale, David Kidwell, Marty Crequer, Tevita Vaikona and Aaron Whittaker.

Season Results

References

Defunct rugby league teams in New Zealand
Rugby league in Canterbury, New Zealand
Rugby clubs established in 1994
1994 establishments in New Zealand
1996 disestablishments in New Zealand